Rudolf Jakob Camerarius or Camerer (12 February 1665 – 11 September 1721) was a German botanist and physician.

Life
Camerarius was born at Tübingen, and became professor of medicine and director of the botanical gardens at Tübingen in 1687. He is chiefly known for his investigations on the reproductive organs of plants (De sexu plantarum epistola (1694)).

While other botanists, such as John Ray and Nehemiah Grew, had observed that plants seemed to have sex in some form, and guessed that pollen was the male fertilizing agent, it was Camerarius who did experimental work. In studying the mulberry, he determined that female plants not near to male (staminate) plants produced fruit but with no seeds. Mercurialis and spinach plants fared likewise. With the castor oil plant (Ricinus) and with maize he cut off the staminate flowers (the "tassels" of maize), and likewise observed that no seeds formed. His results were reported in the form of a letter (the epistola), and attracted immediate attention, subsequent workers extending his results from the monoecious plants he had studied to dioecious ones as well.

Works

Notes

References

 Duane Isely, One hundred and one botanists (Iowa State University Press, 1994), pp. 74–76

External links

1665 births
1721 deaths
Scientists from Tübingen
17th-century German botanists
German entomologists
17th-century German physicians
18th-century German physicians
Pre-Linnaean botanists
18th-century German botanists